Aberra is both a given name and a surname most common to Ethiopia.  The Name Means: Powerful and complete. Notable people with the name include:

Amsale Aberra (1954–2018), American fashion designer
Aberra Kassa (1905–1936), Ethiopian noble and military leader

Surnames of African origin